Oscar Peterson Plays Duke Ellington is an album by Canadian jazz pianist Oscar Peterson, of songs associated with Duke Ellington released in 1952 on Clef Records. Peterson re-recorded much of the music for his 1959 album Oscar Peterson Plays the Duke Ellington Song book.

Track listing
"John Hardy's Wife" (M. Ellington) – 3:24
"Sophisticated Lady" (Irving Mills, Mitchell Parish) – 3:01
"Things Ain't What They Used to Be" (Mercer Ellington, Ted Persons) – 3:16
"Just A-Sittin' and A-Rockin'" (Lee Gaines, Billy Strayhorn) – 3:45
"In a Mellow Tone"  – 3:09
"I Got It Bad (and That Ain't Good)" (Paul Francis Webster) – 3:17
"Prelude to a Kiss" (Mack Gordon, Mills) – 3:19
"Cotton Tail" – 3:53
"Don't Get Around Much Anymore" (Russell) – 4:00
"Take the "A" Train" (Strayhorn) – 3:19
"Rockin' in Rhythm" (Mills) – 2:56
"Never No Lament (Do Nothin' Til You Hear from Me)" (Bob Russell) – 3:01

All music composed by Duke Ellington, with the exception of "Take the "A" Train", "Things Ain't What They Used to Be", and "John Hardy's Wife", other composers and lyricists indicated.

Personnel
Oscar Peterson – piano
Barney Kessel – guitar
Ray Brown – double bass

References

External links
Jazz Discography entry for Oscar Peterson plays Duke Ellington

1952 albums
Oscar Peterson albums
Albums produced by Norman Granz
Albums with cover art by David Stone Martin
Clef Records albums
Duke Ellington tribute albums